{{DISPLAYTITLE:C23H34N3O10P}} 
The molecular formula C23H34N3O10P (molar mass: 543.50 g/mol, exact mass: 543.1982 u) may refer to: 

 Phosphoramidon 
 Talopeptin 

Molecular formulas